Farmington Hills is a city in Oakland County in the U.S. state of Michigan. Part of the affluent suburbs northwest of Detroit, Farmington Hills is the second most-populated city in Oakland County, after Troy, with a population of 83,986 at the 2020 census. 

Farmington Hills consistently ranks as one of the safest cities in the United States, as well as in the state of Michigan. The area ranked as the 30th safest city in the U.S in 2010 and as the 2nd safest city in Michigan in 2020. Farmington Hills also ranks as the 36th highest-income place in the United States with a population of 50,000 or more and ranked as 14th America's best cities to live by 24/7 Wall St. in 2016.

Although the two cities have separate services and addresses, Farmington and Farmington Hills are often thought of as the same community. These two cities combined were part of Farmington Township in the time of the Northwest Territory. Features of the community include a recently renovated downtown, boutiques, a vintage cinema, numerous restaurants, exotic car dealerships, art galleries, and public parks including Heritage Park. There are several historical sites including the Longacre House and the Governor Warner Mansion. Both cities are served by Farmington Public Schools and the Farmington Community Library.

Farmington Hills is the home of the Holocaust Memorial Center, the only Holocaust memorial in the State of Michigan. The Center's mission is to educate the public about the tragedy and evils of the Holocaust.  The Holocaust Memorial Center was originally located in neighboring West Bloomfield Township, but has since expanded and moved to its current facility.

Geography

History
The first white settler in what became Farmington Township was a Quaker from Farmington, New York, named Arthur Power. He purchased land in 1823 and returned in 1824 with a group of families and associates to clear the land. The settlement became known as Quakertown. A post office was established in February 1826 with the name of Farmington. The original post office is still standing today, and is a designated historical site. The township of Farmington was organized in 1827, and the settlement was incorporated as the village of Farmington in the winter of 1866–67. A fire on October 9, 1872, destroyed many buildings in the village center. Farmington was incorporated as a city in 1926.

A small settlement was also developed in Clarenceville, in the extreme southeast corner of the township on the boundary with Livonia in Wayne County. Stephen Jennings built a tavern and a general store to accommodate travelers on the plank road between Detroit and Howell. The name remains in the Clarenceville School District. Even though the school buildings for Clarenceville are in Livonia in Wayne County, the school district serves a portion of Farmington Hills.

In 1839, a post office named East Farmington was opened, but it closed in 1842.

In 1847, a post office named North Farmington was established a mile south of the township line as Wolcott's Corners. After the death of postmaster Chauncey D. Walcott in 1865, the office moved to the township line in the northeast quarter of section 4 (near the intersection of 14 Mile Road and Farmington Road). The post office functioned until September 1902.

Before the remainder of Farmington Township was incorporated as the city of Farmington Hills, there were two other incorporated entities within its boundaries. The first began as a subdivision named Quaker Valley Farms that was incorporated as the village of Quakertown in 1959. The other was Wood Creek Farms, developed in 1937 as a subdivision by George Wellington of Franklin, who named it after a New England estate. It was incorporated as a village in 1957. The villages, together with the remainder of Farmington Township, were incorporated into the City of Farmington Hills in 1973.

Economy
Farmington Hills is home to the headquarters of numerous major companies, including Gale, Mango Languages, 5-Hour Energy, and The Sharper Image, as well as the United States headquarters of Bosch, Mercedes-Benz Financial Services, and TD Auto Finance.

The city was also previously home to the headquarters of Compuware, White Motor Company, A&W Restaurants, and  Michigan National Bank.

Nissan's North American technical center is located in Farmington Hills. The Nissan technical center handled project engineering of vehicle bodies used in North America and Latin America. It also has a small laboratory, where as of 2012, research is being conducted with hydrogen fuel cells. The company planned to add electrical battery and recharging of electrical vehicle research to the laboratory. As of January 2012 the technical center had 800 full-time employees. At that time Nissan planned to hire 150 more engineers to work in the technical center. The technical center opened in November 1991 at a cost of $80 million. In 2005, Nissan added a $14 million design studio at their Farmington Hills campus, and the Nissan AZEAL was the first car to be designed there.

Hitachi Automotive Systems Americas, Inc. maintains an office in Farmington Hills, as does Panasonic Automotive Systems. Lordstown Motors operates a research and development center in Farmington Hills.

According to the city's 2019 Comprehensive Annual Financial Report, the top local employers are:

Government
Farmington Hills utilizes the Council-Manager form of government, and thus is governed by a City Council consisting of a Mayor who can serve two 2-year terms (Vicki Barnett, elected in 2019) and six council members serving an unlimited number of 4-year terms (Jackie Boleware, elected in 2019; Valerie Knol, elected in 2017; Michael Bridges, elected in 2017; Ken Massey, elected in 2019; Mary Newlin, elected in 2019). The city council appoints a City Manager (currently: Gary Mekjian), who manages the day-to-day operations of the city; a City Clerk who maintains all City Codes, Ordinances, Resolutions and other legal documents (currently Pam Smith); and a City Attorney who acts as legal advisor and representative for all City matters (currently Steve Joppich).

Farmington Hills is part of Michigan's State House Districts 18, 19 and 21.  It is represented in the State Senate as part of Districts 6 and 13.

The Mayor's Youth Council is an active teen committee/council who work under the city to help address teen problems and issues. This council helped to build the Riley Skate Park (the largest skate park in the Midwest), and sends delegates to the National League of Cities (NLC) conferences, has articles published in the local newspaper, helps run citywide events, organizes battle of the bands, and hosts their own talk show.
The Commission for Children, Youth and Families - operated in partnership with neighboring Farmington - is dedicated to creating a welcoming community for individuals of all ages and backgrounds.  With a special emphasis on volunteerism, community service and education, the Commission partners with the Multi-Racial Multi-Cultural Commission (MRMC), the Commission on Aging, Farmington Public School District and the Farmington Public Library to inform residents on a variety of quality-of-life issues designed to promote wellness, access and knowledge.

In 2006, a public meeting was held in Farmington Hills to discuss the possible merger of the two cities as a money saving venture, and also as a way to keep the two communities vibrant. Farmington and Farmington Hills already share several services, such as a school district, a library system and a district court, however, both cities utilize their own fire departments, and Farmington has a public safety department rather than a police department.

Demographics

According to a 2015 estimate, the median income for a household in the city was $93,274, and the median income for a family was $198,136. Males had a median income of $61,757 versus $39,540 for females. The per capita income for the city was $36,134. Farmington Hills is well known for its luxury estates, its rolling hills, and is also listed on Forbes as one of the most prosperous suburbs in the USA, with a household net worth of $725,120. About 2.4% of families and 4.1% of the population were below the poverty line, including 3.2% of those under age 18 and 7.6% of those age 65 or over.

2020 census
As of the census of 2020, there were 83,986 people residing in the city, and 33,972 households. The racial makeup of the city was 62.7% White, 19.9% Black or African American, 0.4% Native American, 14.1% Asian, and 2.4% from two or more races. Hispanic or Latino of any race were 2.3% of the population.

2010 census
As of the census of 2010, there were 79,740 people, 33,559 households, and 21,412 families residing in the city. The racial makeup of the city was 69.7% White, 17.4% African American, 0.2% Native American, 10.1% Asian, 0.4% from other races, and 2.2% from two or more races. Hispanic or Latino of any race were 1.9% of the population.

There were 33,559 households, of which 29.1% had children under the age of 18 living with them, 50.7% were married couples living together, 9.9% had a female householder with no husband present, 3.2% had a male householder with no wife present, and 36.2% were non-families. 31.5% of all households were made up of individuals, and 12% had someone living alone who was 65 years of age or older. The average household size was 2.36 and the average family size was 3.00.

The median age in the city was 42.1 years. 21.5% of residents were under the age of 18; 7.1% were between the ages of 18 and 24; 25.2% were from 25 to 44; 30.2% were from 45 to 64; and 15.9% were 65 years of age or older. The gender makeup of the city was 47.1% male and 52.9% female.

In April 2013, Farmington Hills had the fourth largest Japanese national population in the state of Michigan, at 589.

2000 census
As of the census of 2000, there were 82,111 people, 33,559 households, and 21,813 families residing in the city. The racial makeup of the city was 82.95% White, 6.94% African American, 0.17% Native American, 7.54% Asian, 0.02% Pacific Islander, 0.46% from other races, and 1.93% from two or more races. Hispanic or Latino of any race were 1.47% of the population. 12.6% were of German, 9.1% Polish, 8.3% Irish, 7.1% English and 5.5% Italian ancestry according to Census 2000.

There were 33,559 households, out of which 29.5% had children under the age of 18 living with them, 56.0% were married couples living together, 6.6% had a female householder with no husband present, and 35.0% were non-families. 29.6% of all households were made up of individuals, and 10.2% had someone living alone who was 65 years of age or older.  The average household size was 2.41 and the average family size was 3.04.

In the city, the population was spread out, with 23.1% under the age of 18, 6.7% from 18 to 24, 31.3% from 25 to 44, 24.6% from 45 to 64, and 14.4% who were 65 years of age or older.  The median age was 39 years. For every 100 females, there were 93.8 males.  For every 100 females age 18 and over, there were 90.2 males.

Education

Primary and secondary schools

Most of Farmington Hills is served by Farmington Public Schools, which is shared with nearby Farmington. Farmington Hills is home to North Farmington High School, while Farmington High School in Farmington also serves portions of Farmington Hills. Farmington Hills is also served by an alternative high school, Farmington Central. From 1970 until its closing in 2019, Harrison High School also operated in the city, before being converted into a community center, named The Hawk.

Farmington Hills also encompasses parts of the Clarenceville School District, and the Walled Lake Consolidated School District.

Farmington Hills is also home to multiple elementary and middle schools.  The elementary schools consist of grades Kindergarten through 5th and the middle schools take grades 6 through 8.  The elementary schools include Beechview Elementary School, Forest Elementary School, Gill Elementary School, Hillside Elementary School, Kenbrook Elementary School, Lanigan Elementary School, Longacre Elementary School, and Wood Creek Elementary School.  The three middle schools are East Middle School, Power Middle School and Warner Middle School.  O.E. Dunckel Middle School was closed in the spring of 2016 with a view to being relaunched as a K-8 STEAM (Science, Technology, Engineering, Arts, and Mathematics) school.

The area includes several private schools, including two parochial Catholic schools, Our Lady of Sorrows and St. Fabian, run by the Archdiocese of Detroit. St. Fabian is in Farmington Hills, and Our Lady of Sorrows School is in Farmington. Farmington Hills also includes an all-girls Catholic high school, Mercy High School, one Lutheran school, Concordia Lutheran School/St. Paul's Lutheran Preschool, and a non-denominational Jewish day school, Hillel Day School.

Colleges and universities
The city also contains branches of Oakland Community College and Wayne State University, and is the home of the Michigan School of Professional Psychology.

Transportation
Suburban Mobility Authority for Regional Transportation (SMART) operates local and regional bus transit.

The major thoroughfares in the city are M-5, Orchard Lake Road, 12 Mile Road, 8 Mile Road, Northwestern Highway, I-696, and I-275.  The city contains several freeway interchanges connecting local roads to the two interstates.

Notable people
Notable current and former residents include:
 Jena Irene Asciutto, singer, American Idol runner-up
 Steve Ballmer, businessman, former CEO of Microsoft, owner of the NBA's Los Angeles Clippers
 Elizabeth Berkley, actress
 Jody Lockman, inventor of the corn flake shake
 Manoj Bhargava, founder and CEO, 5-hour Energy
 Pam Dawber, actress
 Alex DeBrincat, NHL hockey player for the Ottawa Senators
 Colin Egglesfield, actor
 Donald Foss (born 1945), billionaire founder of subprime car finance company Credit Acceptance
 Cam Fowler, NHL hockey player for the Anaheim Ducks
 Devin Funchess, wide receiver for the NFL's Detroit Lions
 Tatiana Gutsu, two-time Olympic champion gymnast
 Kirsten Haglund, winner of Miss Michigan (2007) and Miss America (2008)
 Arthur Hanlon, Latin musician
 Al Jean, writer/producer, The Simpsons 
 Bill Joy, co-founder of Sun Microsystems
 Meg Mallon, professional golfer in Hall of Fame
 Emily Morse, sex therapist
 Jason Miller, rabbi and entrepreneur
 Larry Nassar, osteopathic physician and convicted child molester
 Jaime Ray Newman, actress
 Eren Ozker, puppeteer, Muppeteer
Austin Price (born 1995), basketball player in the Israeli Premier Basketball League
 Cayden Primeau, NHL hockey goaltender for the Montreal Canadiens
 Neal Rubin, columnist for The Detroit News
 Barry Sanders, Hall of Fame running back for the Detroit Lions; resident
 Martha Smith, model and actress, Miss July 1973 Playboy centerfold
 Drew Stanton, retired NFL quarterback who played for the Michigan State Spartans football team
 Tally Hall, indie rock band based in Ann Arbor
 Fred Toucher, Boston radio DJ for 98.5 The Sports Hub
 James Wolk, actor
 Brian S. Eifler, 11th Airborne Division commanding general
 Cory DeVante Williams, Youtuber

See also

 Farmington Community Library
 Farmington
 Metropolitan Detroit

References

Sources

External links

City of Farmington Hills official website

 
Cities in Oakland County, Michigan
Metro Detroit
1827 establishments in Michigan Territory
Populated places established in 1827